Johnathan Jerone Arrington (born January 23, 1983) is a former American football running back. He played college football at College of the Canyons and the University of California, Berkeley, and received consensus All-American recognition. The Arizona Cardinals selected him in the second round of the 2005 NFL Draft. He also played for the Denver Broncos and had a brief stint with the Philadelphia Eagles and Las Vegas Locomotives of the UFL. He also was the last player to get the Pop Warner Award.

Early years
Arrington was born in Nashville, North Carolina.  He attended Northern Nash High School and was a letterman in football as a tailback. In football, he was a three-year varsity starter and a two-time All-Conference selection. He was also named his team's Most Valuable Player and the Area Offensive Player of the Year as a senior.

College career
Arrington was sent to College of the Canyons by East Carolina University with the intent that he would play for the Pirates in two years.  As a sophomore at College of the Canyons, he won All-Region III honors (which is selected by the California Community College Football Coaches Association and the Junior College Athletic Bureau) and had 135 rushing attempts for 769 yards (5.7 yards per rushing attempt average), and caught 30 passes for 320 yards (10.67 yards per reception average). His 19 touchdowns that season, and 29 career touchdowns, were both school records.

Arrington transferred to the University of California, Berkeley as a junior, and played for the California Golden Bears football team in 2003 and 2004.  Arrington would receive few carries for most of the 2003 season aside from his 114-yard performance against Southern Mississippi. A knee injury to then starting running back Adimchinobi Echemandu would thrust Arrington into the starting role against the Washington Huskies. This proved to be his breakout game as he mauled the Huskies defense for 185 yards and a touchdown. It took him only 14 carries to achieve this feat.  In the first half managed to tally 157 yards on ten carries. He also caught a 30-yard touchdown pass from Aaron Rodgers giving him a total of 215 yards on the day.

Despite his performance, he would receive limited carries for the rest of the 2003 season. He did play a pivotal role in the Insight Bowl by catching five passes for 38 yards, including a 13-yard touchdown pass that would reduce Virginia Tech's lead to only 28–21 at halftime. Cal would ultimately prevail 52–49 on a game-winning field goal.

The 2004 season would see Arrington earn the starting tailback spot after the departure of Echemandu for the NFL. Arrington played a major role in the Cal Bears' first 10-win season since 1949. He would rush for at least 100 yards in every single game that season. Arrington rushed for 169 yards or more in eight of his team's 12 games as well.

Ultimately Arrington would have one of the greatest seasons of any running back in NCAA and Pac-10 history, gaining 2,018 rushing yards that season. He became only the third Pac-10 Tailback to gain over 2,000 yards, joining USC tailbacks Marcus Allen and Charles White. His mark is also the tenth best total in NCAA history. He would receive the honor of the Pop Warner Award, deeming him the best College Football player on the west coast. He would also earn All-American and All-Pacific-10 conference honors.

Ultimately, the season would end in disappointment. Despite a stellar 10–1 record, the Bears were bypassed for a BCS Bowl bid by The University of Texas. As a result, they played in the Pacific Life Holiday Bowl against a 7-4 Texas Tech squad, where Cal was upset by a score of 45–31, a disappointing end to Arrington's college career.

In addition, Arrington was not even invited to the Heisman Trophy ceremony (a distinction afforded the top three to five likely winners) despite having a better statistical year (15 TDs, 2018 yards rushing, 6.98 yards per carry) than the number 2 vote-getter, Adrian Peterson (15 TDs, 1925 yards rushing, 5.68 yards per carry).

Professional career

Arizona Cardinals
After drafting him in the second round of the 2005 NFL Draft, the Cardinals placed him as the starting running back on the depth chart, with the intention of having him share carries with Marcel Shipp.  He started the first game against the New York Giants gaining 5 yards on 8 carries (0.625 average).  After this poor showing in his first game, he didn't play a snap the second game of the season against the St. Louis Rams.  By the end of the season, he had played 15 games with 5 starts, gaining 370 yards on 112 carries (3.3 average) and 2 touchdowns. That following offseason the Cardinals signed Edgerrin James.

The Cardinals' drafting of Tim Hightower in 2008 resulted in Arrington being shifted to third place on the depth chart at running back. He became the team's principal kick returner and in Super Bowl XLIII caught 2 passes for 35 yards.

Denver Broncos
Arrington signed with the Denver Broncos on March 4, 2009. He was released on May 27, 2009, after failing his physical. It was determined that Arrington would need season-ending microfracture surgery on his right knee, following surgery to the same knee in February. He was re-signed on March 4, 2010.

Philadelphia Eagles
Arrington was traded to the Philadelphia Eagles in exchange for linebacker Joe Mays on July 30, 2010. He was waived on September 3. Due to Arrington being released prior to the start of the season, the Eagles received a 2012 sixth-round draft pick from the Broncos.

Las Vegas Locomotives
Before the 2011 season, Arrington signed with the Las Vegas Locomotives of the United Football League.

See also
 List of college football yearly rushing leaders

References

External links
 Cal Bears bio

1983 births
Living people
All-American college football players
American football return specialists
American football running backs
Arizona Cardinals players
California Golden Bears football players
College of the Canyons Cougars football players
Denver Broncos players
Las Vegas Locomotives players
People from Nashville, North Carolina
Philadelphia Eagles players
Players of American football from North Carolina